Ravinder Raina (born 31 January 1977) is an Indian politician from  Jammu and Kashmir. He is a member of Rashtriya Swayamsevak Sangh.

Early life and education
He was born on 31 January 1977 to Shri Pushap Dutt into a Pahari-Brahmin family in Nowshera, in the Rajouri district of Jammu. He did his graduation in B.Sc. in 1999 from Jammu University, Jammu. He also holds a postgraduate degree in International law of Human Rights. After completing graduation, Raina joined the merchant navy but later he returned as Human Rights activist in 2004.

Political career
Ravinder Raina has been closely associated with the welfare of victims of terrorism in the state. Raina was advised to join the BJP by former prime minister Vajpayee during a meeting. His hardwork and dedication soon give him a chance to work as the state president of party's youth wing: the Bharatiya Janata Yuva Morcha (BJYM).
During the budget session in early 2018, Raina led his party colleagues several times in shouting anti-Pakistan slogans in the House to protest against the frequent ceasefire violations by the neighbouring country along the Line of Control (LoC).

Controversy
Raina courted controversy in 2015 when he took oath as MLA in Jammu and Kashmir Legislative Assembly in the name of "Mata Vaishno Devi". Members of opposition registered their objection by saying that there is no provision for a member of the legislative house to take oath in the name of "Mata Vaishno Devi". Protem Speaker Mohmmad Shafi had to intervene in the matter and later he asked Raina to take oath in the name of God.

References

State Presidents of Bharatiya Janata Party
Jammu and Kashmir politicians
Pahari Pothwari people
People from Rajouri district
Bharatiya Janata Party politicians from Jammu and Kashmir
1977 births
Living people